The Girl from Monterrey is a 1943 American film directed by Wallace Fox starring Armida Vendrell as PRCs version of the Mexican Spitfire.

The film is also known as The Girl from Monterey (American alternative spelling).

Plot summary
In a Mexican nightclub, some American fight promoters witness Alberto 'Baby' Valdez, the brother of Lita Valdez knock out a champion fighter.  At first Lita is angered that her brother has quit his law studies to become a fighter, but the two move to the United States.  Lita literally bumps into reigning champion Jerry O'Leary with the three becoming inseparable friends.  However the American fight promoters force Alberto and Jerry to fight each other or face suspension.

Cast
Armida Vendrell as Lita Valdez
Edgar Kennedy as Doc Hogan, Fight Promoter
Veda Ann Borg as Flossie Rankin
Jack La Rue as Al Johnson
Terry Frost as Jerry O'Leary
Anthony Caruso as Alberto 'Baby' Valdez
Charles Williams as Harry Hollis
Bryant Washburn as Fight Commissioner Bogart
Guy Zanette as Tony Perrone
Wheeler Oakman as Fight Announcer
Jay Silverheels as Fighter Tito Flores
Renee Helms as Hat Check Girl

Soundtrack
 Armida - "Jive, Brother, Jive" (Written by Lou Herscher and Harold Raymond)
 Armida - "Last Night's All Over" (Written by Lou Herscher and Harold Raymond)
 Armida - "The Girl from Monterrey" (Written by Lou Herscher and Harold Raymond)

External links
 
 
 

1943 films
American black-and-white films
1940s thriller films
Producers Releasing Corporation films
American boxing films
Films directed by Wallace Fox
American thriller films
1940s English-language films
1940s American films